The 1966–67 National Hurling League was the 36th season of the National Hurling League.

Division 1

Kilkenny came into the season as defending champions of the 1965-66 season. Offaly joined Division 1 as the promoted team.

On 28 May 1967, Wexford won the title after a 3-10 to 1-9 win over Kilkenny in the final. It was their 3rd league title overall and their first since 1957-58.

In spite of finishing at the bottom of their respective groups, neither Galway of Laois were relegated as there was no promotion-relegation this season.

Kilkenny's Eddie Keher was the Division 1 top scorer with 6-48.

Division 1A table

Group stage

Division 1A final

Division 1B table

Group stage

Play-offs

Knock-out stage

Semi-finals

Final

Scoring statistics

Top scorers overall

Top scorers in a single game

Division 2

On 30 April 1967, Kerry won the title after a 4-8 to 3-8 win over Meath in the final. It was their 3rd Division 2 title overall and their first since 1961-62.

Division 2A table

Division 2B table

Knock-out stage

Semi-finals

Final

Division 3

Mayo came into the season as defending champions of the 1965-66 season.

On 1 October 1967, Louth won the title after a 3-5 to 2-4 win over Mayo in the final. It was their first hurling title in any grade.

Division 3A table

Division 3B table

Knock-out stage

Final

References

National Hurling League seasons
Lea
Lea